Scandichrestus is a monotypic genus of sheet-weaving spiders containing the single species, Scandichrestus tenuis. It was first described by J. Wunderlich in 1995, and has only been found in Russia, Finland, and Sweden.

See also
 List of Linyphiidae species (Q–Z)

References

Linyphiidae
Monotypic Araneomorphae genera
Spiders of Russia